The 2010–11 MHL season was the second season of the Junior Hockey League. MHK Red Army won the league title. The league was divided into two conferences, and four divisions. A total of 16 teams, four from each conference, qualified for the playoffs.

Regular season

League standings

Points are awarded as follows:
3 Points for a win in regulation ("W")
2 Points for a win in overtime ("OTW") or a penalty shootout ("SOW")
1 Point for a loss in overtime ("OTL") or a penalty shootout ("SOL")
0 Points for a loss in regulation ("L")

Western Conference

Northwest Division

Central Division

Eastern Conference

Volga Division

Ural-Sibirian Division

Playoffs

External links 
 Season on hockeyarchives.info

Junior Hockey League (Russia) seasons
3